The Santa Catalina de Alejandria Church, also referred to as the Arayat Church, is Renaissance-style church located at Arayat, Pampanga, Philippines. Since its initial construction during the late 1700s, it has been subjected to major alterations and changes such as addition of decorative ornaments and reliefs and re-painting works.

History

On August 29, 1590, Bishop Domingo Salazar approved the request of Augustinians to establish its first mission at the town of Arayat. In 1600, Fray Contreras established the parish church of Arayat. The church was dedicated to Santa Catalina de Alejandria, a 4th-century martyr. She was considered as one of the most important saints of the Medieval Period. Her feast day is celebrated every 25 November.

Architectural history

Santa Catalina Church was built in 1753, based on the canonical books stating that baptismal activities have been conducted by Fray Villalobos since 1758. At present, it belongs to the parish of the Vicariate of Mary, Help of Christians, in the Archdiocese of San Fernando.

Fr. Jose Torres
  In 1858, he made restorations on the church.

Fr. Juan Tarrero
 He continued the restoration work initiated by Fr. Jose Torres. However, he was not able to finish it due to the Philippine Revolution.

Fr. Urbano Bedoya
 In 1892, he finished the restoration work began by his predecessors.

Architectural features

Santa Catalina Church measures 70 meters long and 16 meters wide. It is 12 meters in height.

The Renaissance-style facade is characterized with its frontal arcade on the second level and Celtic-like cross windows on the sides. Another feature is the pediment with its axial feature of a blind pointed archway framing a small semi-circular arched window placed underneath a superimposed gabled plane. An image of Santa Catalina is located at the portico of the church while a separate antique image is located at the main altar. The bell tower at the left has chamfered corners and was covered by a domical roof. At present, it has been replaced by intersecting gable roofs.

A marble engraving is present at the topmost part of the arched main doorway. It states:

"JUAN MEDINA LUISA GABRIEL: DONANTES DE LOS VIENTE MIL PESOS PARA LA REPARACION DE ESTA IGLESIA DE ARAYAT. 1923."

References

Roman Catholic churches in Pampanga
Augustinian churches in the Philippines
Churches in the Roman Catholic Archdiocese of San Fernando